Bryce  is a surname of Celtic origin which may denote membership of Sept Bryce, a sept of Clan MacFarlane. Bryce may also refer to:

A. Catrina Bryce (born 1956), Scottish electrical engineer 
Alfredo Bryce (born 1939), Peruvian author
Colette Bryce (born 1970), Northern Irish poet
Dennis Bryce (contemporary), Samoan football player
Ebenezer Bryce (1830–1913), American pioneer best known as the person for whom Bryce Canyon National Park was named
Elizabeth Bryce, mistress of Henry VIII of England and self-proclaimed "witch and prophetess", arrested for treason
George Bryce (1844–1931), Canadian Presbyterian minister and author
Isabel Graham Bryce (1902–1997), British public servant
Jabez Bryce (born 1935–2010), Tongan leader in the Anglican Church; Bishop of Polynesia
James Bryce (Belfast) (1806–1877), Irish naturalist and geologist
James Bryce, 1st Viscount Bryce (1838–1922), British jurist, historian, and politician
James W. Bryce (1880–1949), American engineer and inventor
John Bryce (1833–1913), New Zealand politician; member of parliament and government minister
John Bryce (born 1934), Scottish television producer
John Annan Bryce (1841–1923), Scottish politician
Kathryn Bryce (born 1997), cricketer in Scotland women's national cricket team, first Scots cricketer in the top ten of the ICC Women's Player Rankings
Lloyd Bryce (1851–1917), American politician from New York; U.S. representative 1887–89
Marjery Bryce (1891–1973), British suffragette and actor
Peter Bryce (1853–1932), Canadian public health physician
Quentin Bryce (born 1942), Australian former Governor of Queensland; former Governor-General of Australia
Robert Bryce (1910–1997), Canadian civil servant
Robert Bryce (writer) (contemporary), American journalist and author
Sarah Bryce (born 2000), cricketer in Scotland women's national cricket team
Scott Bryce (born 1958), American film and television actor
Soren Bryce, American electronic musician
Steven Bryce (born 1977), Costa Rican football player
Trevor R. Bryce (born 1940), Hittitologist and historian of antiquity
William Bryce (1888–1963), Canadian politician from Manitoba

See also 
 Bryce (given name)
 Bryce (disambiguation)

Anglicised Scottish Gaelic-language surnames